DB9 or DB-9 may refer to:

 Aston Martin DB9, a British sports car
 Darren Bent, English football forward who wears the number 9 shirt for Aston Villa F.C.
 DB9 (yacht), a superyacht built by Palmer Johnson in 2010
 DE-9 connector, a common type of D-subminiature electrical connector (often erroneously called DB-9)
 Dimitar Berbatov, Bulgarian footballer who plays as a forward for Fulham F.C. wearing a number 9 shirt